Janusz Kubicki (born 31 December 1969 in Szprotawa, Poland) is a Polish  politician who has been the Mayor of Zielona Góra since 2006. In the November 2010 municipal elections, he was reelected as the mayor ("president") of Zielona Góra. He received 64.87% of the votes in the first round, and a second round was not needed.

Agata's husband, the father of two sons, Wojciech and Piotr.

References

External links
 Biography,Municipal website

People from Zielona Góra
Democratic Left Alliance politicians
Living people
1969 births